Events in the year 1966 in Portugal.

Incumbents
President: Américo Tomás 
Prime Minister: António de Oliveira Salazar

Arts and entertainment
Portugal participated in the Eurovision Song Contest 1966, with Madalena Iglésias and the song "Ele e ela".

Sport
In association football, for the first-tier league seasons, see 1965–66 Primeira Divisão and 1966–67 Primeira Divisão; for the Taça de Portugal seasons, see 1965–66 Taça de Portugal and 1966–67 Taça de Portugal. 
 22 May - Taça de Portugal Final
 6 June - Establishment of U.D. Leiria
 Establishment of the Portuguese Handball Second Division
 Establishment of C.D. Fátima and Rebordosa AC

Deaths

26 February – Delfim Santos, academic, philosopher, educationist, essayist and book and movie reviewer (born 1907).

References

 
Portugal
Years of the 20th century in Portugal
Portugal